Young Americans is a 1967 American documentary film directed by Alexander Grasshoff and chronicling the travel experiences of the Young Americans choir. It was awarded an Academy Award for Best Documentary Feature in 1969, though this was subsequently revoked because the film was released in 1967 and was thus ineligible. The documentary is the only film in history to have had its Oscar revoked. Actress and singer Vicki Lawrence, later of The Carol Burnett Show, can also be seen in musical numbers.

Plot 
A profile of the Los Angeles based youth show choir The Young Americans, a group of teenage high school and college students who embody a sense of wholesomeness and patriotism under the direction of Milton Anderson, is dramatized as they prepare for a fall performing tour of the United States via bus, and make plans for what they hope will be a European tour following. The audition and rehearsal process for a group that will be whittled down to thirty-six tour members - half males, half females - is shown, with Anderson looking for more than just vocalists in the group being a show choir, with some of those members, chosen or not, showing and telling why being part of the group is so important to them. They are shown on the tour, which would include stops in Boston, New York City, a state fair and the Illinois State Penitentiary, not only in performance, but in social situations. But with a group of approximately fifty which also includes tour organizers, chaperons and crew members, not all always goes smoothly, especially as teenagers will sometimes just be teenagers despite what their adult authority figures want or expect.

Release
The film premiered at the Plaza Theatre in Kansas City on August 21, 1967, as a benefit for the Will Rogers Hospital.

See also
 List of American films of 1967

References

External links
 

1967 films
American documentary films
1960s English-language films
Films directed by Alex Grasshoff
Documentary films about music and musicians
Columbia Pictures films
Show choirs
1960s American films